The NWA Mississippi Tag Team Championship was a professional wrestling tag team championship in Gulf Coast Championship Wrestling (GCCW). A secondary title complementing the NWA Gulf Coast Tag Team Championship, it was one of many state tag team championships recognized by the National Wrestling Alliance.

Some reigns were held by champions using a ring name, while others used their real name. There have been a total of 13 recognized individual champions and 8 recognized teams, who have had a combined 10 official reigns. The first champions were The Interns (Joe Turner and Bill Bowman), and the final champions were "Cowboy" Bob Kelly and Frank Dalton. At 60 days, Kelly and Dalton's first reign was the longest, while the team of Rip Tyler and Eduardo Perez's first reign was the shortest, at less than two weeks.

The team of Bob Kelly and Frank Dalton and the team of Bob Kelly and Bobby Fields are tied with the most reigns as champions, with two each. Kelly has the most individual reigns with four. The following is a chronological list of teams that have been Mississippi Tag Team Champions by ring name.

Title history

Footnotes

References
General

Specific

External links
NWA Mississippi Tag Team Championship (Gulf Coast version) at Wrestlingdata.com

National Wrestling Alliance championships
Tag team wrestling championships
National Wrestling Alliance state wrestling championships
Professional wrestling in Mississippi